

There are twenty-three Sites of Special Scientific Interest (SSSIs) in the county of the West Midlands, England. , of the twenty-three designated sites, eleven have been designated due to their biological interest, nine due to their geological interest and three for both. In England, the body responsible for designating SSSIs is Natural England, which chooses sites because of their flora, fauna, geological or physiographical features. Natural England took over the role of designating and managing SSSIs from English Nature in October 2006 when it was formed from the amalgamation of English Nature, parts of the Countryside Agency and the Rural Development Service. Natural England, like its predecessor, uses the 1974-1996 county system with each area being called an Area of Search. In the West Midlands case, the Area of Search matches the county boundary.

The West Midlands is the second largest conurbation, after Greater London, with a population of over 2.6 million inhabitants. Consisting of three large cities, Wolverhampton, Birmingham and Coventry, the county of the West Midlands is also one of the most densely populated areas in the United Kingdom. The result of this large human population is that every part of the area has been influenced by humans—often negatively—for example, the clearance of woodland to make room for agriculture. It is crossed by Britain's main north-south watershed between the basins of the Rivers Severn and Trent. The main habitat types in the area are heathland, woodland and grassland, all of which are found in both urban and rural contexts.

A smaller green belt is located between Birmingham, Walsall and West Bromwich which includes Sutton Park in Sutton Coldfield. Sutton Park, an SSSI and national nature reserve, has an area of  making it one of the largest urban parks in Europe and the largest European park outside a capital city.

Sites

See also
List of SSSIs by Area of Search
List of Sites of Special Scientific Interest in Warwickshire
List of Sites of Special Scientific Interest in Staffordshire
List of conservation areas in the West Midlands

Notes
 Data rounded to one decimal place.
 Grid reference is based on the British national grid reference system, also known as OSGB36, and is the system used by the Ordnance Survey.
 Those SSSIs with more than one OS grid reference are composed of multiple sections, separated by non-SSSI land.
 Site notification consists of designating a site as an SSSI and consulting with the owner(s). This list uses the date notified under Section 28 of the Wildlife and Countryside Act 1981.
 Link to maps using the Nature on the Map service provided by Natural England.
 The River Blythe site extends into the county of Warwickshire and so can be found on the list of SSSIs in Warwickshire.

References

 
West Midlands
Sites of Special